Valley Stream 13 Union Free School District is a public school district in New York State that serves about 2200 students in the villages of Valley Stream and Malverne, the hamlets of Franklin Square and Elmont, and the community of North Valley Stream in Nassau County with a staff of 250 (180 teachers and 70 support staff) and a budget of $40 million. It is unique in that most school districts in New York State encompass grades K–12 while this district includes elementary grades K–6 only. It is one of three Valley Stream districts (the others are Elementary Districts 24 and 30) whose students graduate to a separately managed district, Valley Stream Central High School District, for the higher grades.

The average class size is 20 students (all grades). The student-teacher ratio is 12:1.

Adrienne Robb-Fund is the Superintendent of Schools.

The District motto is "Where Children Come First".
There are different addresses for the different schools.

Board of education
The Board of Education (BOE) consists of 7 members who serve rotating 3-year terms. Elections are held each May for board members and to vote on the School District Budget.

Schools
The district operates four schools:

Elementary schools
James A. Dever Elementary School (K-6)
Howell Road Elementary School (K-6)
Wheeler Avenue Elementary School (1-6)
Willow Road Elementary School (K-6)

Middle schools
none, see Valley Stream Central High School District

High schools
none, see Valley Stream Central High School District

Performance
In 2003, 96% of students tested at acceptable levels 3 or 4 in Elementary-Level Social Studies. In 2008, student test scores exceeded the state average in all grades and tested subject areas of New York State standardized tests.

See also
Valley Stream 24 Union Free School District
Valley Stream 30 Union Free School District

References

External links
District Website
New York State School Boards Association

Valley Stream, New York
School districts in New York (state)
Education in Nassau County, New York